George Reynolds (by 1518 – 1577) was an English politician.

He was a Member (MP) of the Parliament of England for Rye in 1547 and 1563.

References

1577 deaths
English MPs 1547–1552
English MPs 1563–1567
Year of birth uncertain